Safiya Umoja Noble is a professor at UCLA, and is the Co-Founder and Co-Director of the UCLA Center for Critical Internet Inquiry. She is the author of Algorithms of Oppression, and co-editor of two edited volumes: The Intersectional Internet: Race, Sex, Class and Culture and Emotions, Technology & Design. She is a research associate at the Oxford Internet Institute at the University of Oxford. She was appointed a Commissioner to the University of Oxford Commission on AI and Good Governance in 2020. In 2020 she was nominated to the Global Future Council on Artificial Intelligence for Humanity at the World Economic Foundation.

Early life and education 
Noble grew up in Fresno, California where she attended Roosevelt School of the Arts. She went on to study Sociology at California State University, Fresno with a focus on African American and Ethnic Studies. While at Fresno State, Noble was involved with the "campus political scene," protesting against apartheid and campaigning for racial and gender equality. She was a member of the Associated Students, Inc. and the California Statewide Student Association. After she graduated, Noble worked for more than a decade in multicultural marketing, advertising and public relations.

Noble attended University of Illinois at Urbana–Champaign for graduate studies where she earned a Masters and Ph.D. in Library and Information Science. Her 2012 dissertation, Searching for black girls: old traditions in new media, considered how gender and race manifest on technology platforms.

Career 
Noble was appointed assistant professor at the University of Illinois at Urbana–Champaign in the Department of African-American studies, the Department of Media and Cinema Studies and the Institute for Communication Research. Noble joined University of California, Los Angeles's Department of Information Studies in 2014. She was awarded the University of California, Los Angeles Early Career Award in 2016. The same year she was appointed a Hellman Fellow in for research in a non-commercial public information index system. Noble received tenure at UCLA and was promoted to associate professor in 2018.

Noble joined the University of Southern California from 2017-2019 as a visiting assistant professor. At USC, she focused on the politics and human and civil rights concerns of digital media platforms, which includes the integration of these issues in STEM and engineering education.

On 25 September 2020, Noble was named as one of the 25 members of the "Real Facebook Oversight Board", an independent monitoring group over Facebook. In October 2020, she was featured in conversation with Meghan, Duchess of Sussex and Prince Harry, Duke of Sussex on the harms of technology, and her book Algorithms of Oppression has been cited by Meghan, Duchess of Sussex for how "the digital space really shapes our thinking about race."

Noble was awarded a MacArthur Fellowship in 2021.

Research
Noble's research focuses on gender, technology and culture, and how they influence the design and use of the internet. Her work has appeared in academic publications and popular media outlets including Time and Bitch. In 2016, Noble edited Emotions, Technology & Design and The Intersectional Internet: Race, Sex, Culture and Class Online . The goal of Emotions, Technology & Design and The Internet: Race, Sex, Culture and Class Online is to provide a text to stimulate individuals to think about new methods of global internets. She is the co-editor of the Commentary & Criticism section of the journal Feminist Media Studies. She is a member of several academic journal and advisory boards which include both Taboo: The Journal of Culture and Education, and the Journal of Critical Library and Information Studies.

Algorithms of Oppression 
Noble's first book, Algorithms of Oppression, was published by NYU Press in 2018 and has been globally reviewed in journals such as the Los Angeles Review of Books and featured in the New York Public Library 2018 Best Books for Adults. It considers how bias against people of color is embedded into supposedly neutral search engines. It explores how racism, especially anti-blackness, is generated and maintained by the internet. In it, Noble is greatly concerned with looking at the ways the Black community is commercialized in powerful technological companies. She focuses on companies like Google and Facebook and how their algorithms “black-box” information, e.g.  when a search term is entered, it is unclear how results for the search are derived. Noble's work calls attention to a system that reproduces marginalization. Her hope is to end social injustice and change the perceptions of marginalized people in technology. She blogged about "Digital Infrastructures of Race and Gender" at the Fotomuseum in Zurich's online platform. She has also given talks and interviews about Algorithms of Oppression.

Select publications

Edited volumes

References

External links 

African-American writers
American sociologists
American social sciences writers
21st-century African-American writers
California State University, Fresno alumni
UCLA Graduate School of Education and Information Studies faculty
University of Southern California faculty
University of Illinois School of Information Sciences alumni
American women sociologists
University of Illinois Urbana-Champaign faculty
21st-century American non-fiction writers
21st-century American women writers
American women non-fiction writers
21st-century African-American women writers
MacArthur Fellows